Monterey Place, best known as the Shepard House, is a historic residence in Mobile, Alabama, United States.  The house was designed by architect George Franklin Barber in 1897 for Charles Martin Shepard, the general passenger agent for the Mobile and Ohio Railroad in Mobile. Shepard's daughters, Kate and Isabel, began to use the house as a boarding school in 1910.

The house features elaborate Queen Anne details, eleven fireplaces, and several stained glass windows.  The slightly later neighborhood surrounding the mansion, as well as the street, are also named Monterey Place.  It was placed on the National Register of Historic Places on January 5, 1984.  The house was opened as a bed and breakfast inn about 2002.  In February 2008, the house and current owners were filmed for an episode of Home & Garden Television's If Walls Could Talk.

See also
List of George Franklin Barber works

References

National Register of Historic Places in Mobile, Alabama
Houses on the National Register of Historic Places in Alabama
Houses in Mobile, Alabama
Houses completed in 1898
Queen Anne architecture in Alabama
Bed and breakfasts in Alabama